

Places
 Ahumada Tarifa Forrest in Cadiz Andalusia
 Calle Ahumada in Cadiz Andalusia
 Ahumada, Mexico

Medicine
 Ahumada-DelCastillo Syndrome
 Ahumada South American Walgreens Boots Alliance Subsidiary

Surname
Ahumada is a Spanish surname.

Notable people
A listing of notable people who share the 'Ahumada' surname, segregated by century and embellished with country of birth to provide a view on the distribution of the surname over time and geography.  This listing should be maintained as comprehensive.

Born after 1950
 Argentina: Carlos Ahumada (born 1964); emigrated to Mexico at age 11
 Argentina: Oscar Ahumada (born 1982)
 U.S.A.: Daniel Ahumada  (born 1990) 
 Mexico: Daniel Ahumada  (born 1990)

Compound surnames: "de"

Born after 1700
 Spain: Agustín de Ahumada y Villalón, Marquis of Amarillas (1715–1760); emigrated to region of New Spain contiguous with modern Mexico c.1755

Compound surnames: "y"

Born after 1500
 Spain: Teresa of Ávila (born 'Teresa de Cepeda y Ahumada' 1515–1582)
 Spain: Agustín De Cepeda y Ahumada (1527–1591)
 Spain: Urban de Ahumada y Guerrero. Marqués de Monte-Alto. 1732.

Born after 1900
 Mexico: Ernesto Corripio y Ahumada (born 1919)

References and notes

Surnames of Spanish origin